Ada Buisson (26 March 1839 – 27 December 1866) was an English author and novelist remembered today for her ghost stories.

Biography 
Ada Buisson was born in Battersea in Surrey, the third-born child of French-born merchant Jean François (aka 'John Francis') Buisson (1797–1871) and his English wife Dorothy Jane ( Smither; 1817–1852). Her eldest sibling was Leontine, who later became a teacher, trade union organiser, suffragist and campaigner for women's rights in Queensland in Australia. Her father was declared bankrupt in 1842, and in about 1850 she and her family moved to Brighton, where her mother died in 1852. From 1854 to 1855, along with her sisters Leontine and Irma, she studied Moral Philosophy and Natural History at the women-only  Bedford College in London.

Ada Buisson died in 1866 in Boulogne-sur-Mer, aged 27.

Work 
During her short lifetime Buisson published one novel, Put to the Test (1865), published by John Maxwell. The remainder of her work, consisting of a second novel, A Terrible Wrong: A Novel (1867), published by  T. C. Newby, and various short stories were published shortly after her early death. Various of her writings appeared in Belgravia, a magazine edited by her friend the novelist Mary Elizabeth Braddon, whom she met through Braddon's husband, Buisson's publisher John Maxwell. Buisson's writings were later mistakenly ascribed to Braddon by Montague Summers, the noted authority on Gothic literature.

Buisson's tale "The Ghost's Summons", published posthumously in Belgravia (January 1868), has been anthologised in collections of ghost stories. A collection of all five of her ghost stories, originally printed in Belgravia, was published in 2022 as The Baron's Coffin and Other Disquieting Tales.

References

External links 
 "The Ghost's Summons" by Ada Buisson (1868).  Christmas Ghost Stories: Part 2 – The Gothic Library.
 

1839 births
1866 deaths
19th-century English women writers
19th-century English writers
Alumni of Bedford College, London
English fantasy writers
English horror writers
English people of French descent
English short story writers
English women novelists
Ghost story writers
People from Battersea
Victorian novelists
Victorian women writers
Women horror writers
Writers from London